The following lists events that happened in 1911 in El Salvador.

Incumbents
President: Fernando Figueroa (until 1 March), Manuel Enrique Araujo (starting 1 March)
Vice President: Manuel Enrique Araujo (until 1 March), Onofre Durán (starting 1 March)

Events

January

 January – Voters in El Salvador voted for Manuel Enrique Araujo to be President of El Salvador.

March

 1 March – Independent Manuel Enrique Araujo was sworn in as President of El Salvador. Onofre Durán was sworn in as Vice President.

Births
 22 July – José María Lemus, politician (d. 1993)

References

 
El Salvador
1910s in El Salvador
Years of the 20th century in El Salvador
El Salvador